The 1973 Rothmans Canadian Open was a tennis tournament played on outdoor clay courts at the Toronto Lawn Tennis Club in Toronto in Canada that was part of the 1973 Commercial Union Assurance Grand Prix and of the 1973 WTA Tour. The tournament was held from August 20 through August 26, 1973. Tom Okker and Evonne Goolagong won the singles titles.

Finals

Men's singles

 Tom Okker defeated  Manuel Orantes 6–3, 6–2, 6–1
 It was Okker's 12th title of the year and the 45th of his career.

Women's singles
 Evonne Goolagong defeated  Helga Niessen Masthoff 7–6, 6–4
 It was Goolagong's 6th title of the year and the 37th of her career.

Men's doubles

 Rod Laver /  Ken Rosewall defeated  Owen Davidson /  John Newcombe 7–5, 7–6
 It was Laver's 9th title of the year and the 45th of his career. It was Rosewall's 6th professional title of the year and the 28th of his career.

Women's doubles
 Evonne Goolagong /  Peggy Michel defeated  Martina Navrátilová /  Helga Niessen Masthoff 6–3, 6–2
 It was Goolagong's 7th title of the year and the 38th of her career. It was Michel's 1st title of the year and the 1st of her career.

References

External links
 
 ATP tournament profile
 WTA tournament profile

Rothmans Canadian Open
Rothmans Canadian Open
Rothmans Canadian Open
Rothmans Canadian Open
Canadian Open (tennis)